Durbin Hotel is a historic hotel building located at Rushville, Rush County, Indiana.  It was built about 1855, and is a three-story, brick building with a two-story rear addition constructed in 1885.  It measures .  It features the original central doorway with sidelights and transom and a stepped front gable facade.

It was listed on the National Register of Historic Places in 1982. It is in the Rushville Commercial Historic District.

References

Hotel buildings on the National Register of Historic Places in Indiana
Hotel buildings completed in 1855
Buildings and structures in Rush County, Indiana
National Register of Historic Places in Rush County, Indiana
Historic district contributing properties in Indiana